The 1970 Lafayette Leopards football team was an American football team that represented Lafayette College as an independent during the 1970 NCAA College Division football season.

In their fourth and final year under head coach Harry Gamble, the Leopards compiled a 6–5 record. Richard McKay was the team captain.

Following the decision by the Middle Atlantic Conference to end football competition in its University Division, the Leopards competed as a football independent in 1970, though five of the former league rivals (Bucknell, Delaware, Gettysburg, Lafayette and Lehigh) continued to play an informal round-robin called the "Middle Five". 

The three-way rivalry with Lehigh and Rutgers remained on Lafayette's football schedule, but press reports in 1970 make no mention of a Middle Three Conference champion.

Lafayette played its home games at Fisher Field on College Hill in Easton, Pennsylvania.

Schedule

References

Lafayette
Lafayette Leopards football seasons
Lafayette Leopards football